Cross Lanes is a census-designated place (CDP) and suburb of Charleston in Kanawha County, West Virginia, United States. As of the 2010 census, its population was 9,995.

Geography
Cross Lanes is a census-designated place in the suburbs of Charleston. It is located at  (38.429096, -81.775854).

According to the United States Census Bureau, the Cross Lanes CDP has a total area of 6.4 square miles (16.6 km2), of which 6.4 square miles (16.5 km2) is land and 0.04 square mile (0.1 km2) (0.65%) is water.

Demographics

2010 Census 
As of the census of 2010, there were 9,995 people, 4,053 households. The population density was 1,594.4 people per square mile (615.9/km2). There were 4,481 housing units at an average density of 690.1/sq mi (266.6/km2). The racial makeup of the CDP was 93.63% White, 3.84% Black or African American, 0.21% Native American, 1.24% Asian, 0.02% Pacific Islander, 0.10% from other races, and 0.96% from two or more races. Hispanic or Latino of any race were 0.57% of the population.

There were 4,231 households, out of which 33.0% had children under the age of 18 living with them, 56.5% were married couples living together, 11.0% had a female householder with no husband present, and 29.3% were non-families. 25.2% of all households were made up of individuals, and 6.3% had someone living alone who was 65 years of age or older. The average household size was 2.44 and the average family size was 2.92.

The age distribution of the CDP is: 24.1% under the age of 18, 8.5% from 18 to 24, 31.4% from 25 to 44, 24.9% from 45 to 64, and 11.2% who were 65 years of age or older. The median age was 37 years. For every 100 females, there were 93.2 males. For every 100 females age 18 and over, there were 90.8 males.

The median income for a Cross Lanes household is $45,334, and the median income for a family was $54,649. Males had a median income of $40,758 versus $27,250 for females. The per capita income is $22,719. About 4.1% of families and 5.9% of the population were below the poverty line, including 8.1% of those under age 18 and 6.5% of those age 65 or over.

2000 Census 
As of the census[3] of 2000, there were 10,353 people, 4,231 households, and 2,991 families residing in Cross Lanes. The population density was 1,594.4 people per square mile (615.9/km2). There were 4,481 housing units at an average density of 690.1/sq mi (266.6/km2). The racial makeup of the CDP was 93.63% White, 3.84% Black or African American, 0.21% Native American, 1.24% Asian, 0.02% Pacific Islander, 0.10% from other races, and 0.96% from two or more races. Hispanic or Latino of any race were 0.57% of the population.

Education
Cross Lanes is served by the following schools:

 Cross Lanes Elementary (K-5)
 Point Harmony Elementary (K-5)
 Andrew Jackson Middle (6-8)
 Cross Lanes Christian School (K-12)
 Nitro High School (9–12) — There is no public high school in Cross Lanes.
 West Virginia Junior College

Notable people
 Pentecostal pastor and televangelist T. D. Jakes headed a church, the Greater Emmanuel Temple of Faith, in Cross Lanes, before moving to Dallas in 1996.
 Country singer/songwriter Kathy Mattea grew up in Cross Lanes before moving to Nashville, Tennessee to begin her professional career.

References

Census-designated places in Kanawha County, West Virginia
Census-designated places in West Virginia
Charleston, West Virginia metropolitan area